Barros Cassal is a municipality in the state of Rio Grande do Sul, Brazil.  As of 2020, the estimated population was 11,182.

References

See also
List of municipalities in Rio Grande do Sul

Municipalities in Rio Grande do Sul